Local elections were held in San Pedro, Laguna, on May 13, 2013, within the Philippine general election. The voters elected for the elective local posts in the city: the mayor, vice mayor, and eight councilors.

Mayoral and vice mayoral election
Incumbent Mayor Calixto Catáquiz decided to run for reelection under Nacionalista Party but on 7 May 2013, was disqualified by the Comelec (First Division). He was later substituted by his wife Mrs. Lourdes S. Cataquiz, former Vice Mayor of San Pedro (2004-2007). Her opponents are the incumbent vice-mayor Norvic Solidum under the Liberal Party and Berlene Alberto an independent candidate.

Seven candidates are running for vice-mayor; Sheriliz Almoro under Liberal Party, Nacionalista Party's Rafael Campos, Melvin Matibag from Nationalist People's Coalition and four independent candidates namely Roland De Leon, Ray Michael Junia, Lito Patromo and Ernesto Remoquillo, Jr.

Results
The candidates for mayor and vice mayor with the highest number of votes wins the seat; they are voted separately, therefore, they may be of different parties when elected.

Mayoral and vice mayoral elections

Municipal Council elections

|-
|bgcolor=black colspan=5|

External links
Official website of the Commission on Elections
 Official website of National Movement for Free Elections (NAMFREL)
Official website of the Parish Pastoral Council for Responsible Voting (PPCRV)

2013 Philippine local elections
Elections in San Pedro, Laguna
2013 elections in Calabarzon